"I Love You Love Me Love" is a song by English glam rock singer Gary Glitter. Written by Glitter with Mike Leander and produced by Leander (unusually in monophonic sound), "I Love You Love Me Love" was Glitter's second number-one single on the UK Singles Chart, spending four weeks at the top of the chart in November 1973, and establishing itself as one of the top 10 best-selling singles of 1973 in the UK. It reached No. 2 in both Ireland and Australia.

Track listing
"I Love You Love Me Love" – 3:15
"Hands Up! It's a Stick Up" – 3:05

Cover versions
It was covered by Tommy James in 1976.
Joan Jett & the Blackhearts recorded it in 1984 for the studio album Glorious Results of a Misspent Youth, released as a single backed by the non-album song "Bird Dog" (12"), and 7" releases with "Talkin' 'Bout My Baby (Live)" or LP track "Long Time", depending on the country of origin.

Charts
It is Glitter's most successful entry in the UK Singles Chart (it entered the chart at number-one and had a 14-week run in the Top 40), earning him the first platinum record (which at the time certified sales of 1 million copies) awarded to a British artist. By November 2012 it had sold 1.14 million copies in the UK.

Weekly Charts

Year-end Charts

Certification

|}

References

External links
 

1973 songs
1973 singles
1976 singles
Gary Glitter songs
Tommy James songs
Songs written by Mike Leander
Songs written by Gary Glitter
Song recordings produced by Mike Leander
UK Singles Chart number-one singles
Fantasy Records singles